Isturits (also Isturitz) is a commune in the Pyrénées-Atlantiques department in south-western France.
It is located in the former province of Lower Navarre (Arberoa).

The Isturitz and Oxocelhaya caves are an important Paleolithic site where a Neanderthal mandible was found, as well as later modern human finds associated with the Aurignacian, Solutrean and Magdalenian. They also include cave paintings and bone flutes.

See also
Communes of the Pyrénées-Atlantiques department

References

Communes of Pyrénées-Atlantiques
Lower Navarre
Pyrénées-Atlantiques communes articles needing translation from French Wikipedia